Danny Berrios (born October 29, 1961) is an American Christian music singer-songwriter and televangelist. Son of Puerto Rican preacher Jose Pepito Berrios and Clara Berrios.

Background
In 1980, Berríos begins his ministry, that same year makes its first presentation in Quetzaltenango (Guatemala) in a campaign that his father Pepito carried out. Since then he has performed hundreds of concerts and presentations live and has released numerous albums.

He has also ministered crusades along with evangelists and Christian leaders recognized internationally, as Luis Palau, Alberto Motessi and Yiye Avila. He has also shared the stage with prestigious U.S. Christian preachers, among them Morris Cerullo, Steve Fatow, Billy Graham, Larry Jones, Larry Lea and Jimmy Swaggart.

Discography

References

External links
 
 

1961 births
Living people
American television evangelists
American male singers
American performers of Christian music
Musicians from Miami
American musicians of Puerto Rican descent
American musicians of Portuguese descent
20th-century American pianists
American male pianists
21st-century American pianists
20th-century American male musicians
21st-century American male musicians